Elias Uddin Mollah (born 2 March 1971) is a Bangladesh Awami League politician and a member of National Parliament of Bangladesh. He was elected from Dhaka-16 constituency.

Biography 
Elias was born to Harun Rashid Mollah, who was also an MP, and Ajma Begum. He attended National Bangla High School. He has not studied beyond intermediate level.

Controversies

2014 Kalshi clashes 
In 2014 he was accused of being involved in an arson attack on a refugee camp of Stranded Pakistanis in Mirpur, Dhaka in which 10 people died.  Mollah denied involvement and blamed a "vested conspiracy" against him.

Racism
In 2015 Elias made racist comments about black people. After a recent trip to the Congo, he said to journalists: 
 Our army has gone there (Africa) to civilise those black people. I am sure they will accomplish the task.
He constantly referred  to the Congolese as "uncivilized black people" and added "People there are yet to become civilised. They take bath every 15 days. After applying soaps before bath, they do not even use water in a bid to retain the aroma." When pointed out that he was being racist and whether the UN had entrusted the Bangladeshi peacekeepers with the responsibility to make Africans "civilised", Mollah said, "No... we are only assisting them to get civilised."

Corruption allegations
In 2016 he was accused of attempting to illegally occupy private homes.

References

Awami League politicians
1971 births
10th Jatiya Sangsad members
Living people
11th Jatiya Sangsad members
9th Jatiya Sangsad members